Edward Golding (1746–1818), of Maiden Erlegh, Berkshire, was an English Member of Parliament.

He represented Fowey on 19 June 1799 – 1802, Plympton Erle in 1802–1806 and Downton on 27 April 1813 – 1818.

References

1746 births
1818 deaths
People from Earley
Members of the Parliament of the United Kingdom for Plympton Erle
British MPs 1796–1800
UK MPs 1802–1806
UK MPs 1812–1818
British East India Company civil servants